is a railway station on the Chikuho Main Line operated by JR Kyushu in Nakama, Fukuoka Prefecture, Japan.

Lines

Station layout 
The station consists of a side and an island platform serving three tracks. A siding branches off track three. The station building houses a staffed ticket window which is open for two hours in the morning only.

Adjacent stations 

|-
|colspan=5 style="text-align:center;" |JR Kyūshū

History 
On the same day, Nakama was opened as an intermediate station along this track. On 1 October 1897, the Chikuho Kogyo Railway, now renamed the Chikuho Railway, merged with the Kyushu Railway. After the Kyushu Railway was nationalized on 1 July 1907, Japanese Government Railways (JGR) took over control of the station. On 12 October 1909, the station became part of the Chikuho Main Line. With the privatization of Japanese National Railways (JNR), the successor of JGR, on 1 April 1987, control of the station passed to JR Kyushu.

On 4 March 2017, Nakama, along with several other stations on the line, became a "Smart Support Station". Under this scheme, the ticket counter opening hours at Nakama were reduced to two hours in the morning between 0630 and 0830 hours. At other times, the station would be unstaffed. Tickets would have to be purchased from automatic ticket vending machines and automatic ticket gates used to enter the platforms. Passengers requiring help would be able to communicate via intercom with staff at a central support centre which is located at Nakama itself.

Passenger statistics
In fiscal 2016, the station was used by an average of 1,868 passengers daily (boarding passengers only), and it ranked 99th among the busiest stations of JR Kyushu.

References

External links
Nakama Station (JR Kyushu)

Railway stations in Fukuoka Prefecture
Railway stations in Japan opened in 1891